Laug is a surname. Notable people with the surname include:

 André Laug (1931–1984), French designer who founded the eponymous fashion house
 Matt Laug (born 1968), American drummer

See also
 Haug (surname)
 Lang (surname)
 Lauge